The Public Affairs Alliance of Iranian Americans, acronym : PAAIA, Inc., is a nonpartisan, nonprofit, nonreligious membership organization that aims to "serve the domestic interests of Iranian Americans and represent the community before U.S. policymakers and the American public at large." PAAIA Inc. and its affiliated 501(c)(3) organization, PAAIA Fund, were founded by a group of Iranian-Americans. The term PAAIA, however, is used to refer to both entities without distinction.

PAAIA also has a connected Political Action Committee, IAPAC, that promotes and contributes to the election of Iranian-American and American candidates for political office.

History
Approximately 70 Iranian-Americans participated in the founding of this organization. As a result, PAAIA was born in August 2007 as a 501(c)(4) nonprofit bipartisan, non-sectarian, national membership organization together with an affiliated 501(c)(3), PAAIA Fund, with the goal of "representing and advancing the interests of the Iranian American community." PAAIA publicly launched in April 2008.

Activities
PAAIA's activities range from promoting legislations such as Nowruz Resolution to holding seminars featuring keynote speakers such as Senator Schumer and Congresswoman Nancy Pelosi.

In 2008, PAAIA commissioned Zogby International to survey the Iranian-American community's attitudes on important issues. A follow-up survey was also conducted in 2009. These surveys were the first of their kind and have been presented to the United States Congress, the media, and the general public. The organization coordinated events with the Noor Iranian Film Festival, showcasing Iranian Cinema from around the world from the festival's main event in Los Angeles, touring films to PAAIA chapter cities.

In 2019, the organization paid $70,000 to the firm Cogent Strategies, in order to lobby the congress on its behalf.

References

External links
 PAAIA Official Web Site
 Payvand News: US House of Representatives Passes the Nowruz Resolution

Iranian-American culture in Washington, D.C.
Iranian-American organizations
Foreign policy political advocacy groups in the United States
Iran–United States relations
Organizations established in 2007
2007 establishments in Washington, D.C.
Lobbying organizations based in Washington, D.C.